Carlos Raul Maslup (9 January 1959 – 23 August 2007) was an Argentine para table tennis player who competed in international elite competitions. He was a Pan American singles' champion, Parapan American Games bronze medalist in the men's singles and competed at the 2004 Summer Paralympics. He was also a Paralympic swimmer and Paralympic athlete at the 1988 Summer Paralympics where he won three silver medals and one bronze medal.

At the 2007 Parapan American Games in Rio de Janeiro, Maslup competed at his second Parapan American Games and won a bronze medal in the men's singles class 1. On 19 August, on the day of the multi-sport event's closing ceremony, Maslup had a stroke in a hotel and he was first taken to the Miguel Couto Hospital but there were no beds available and so he was transferred to the Salgado Filho Hospital. Maslup was in a coma for three days and was diagnosed as brain dead by the hospital doctors on 22 August and died on 23 August in an intensive care unit at the Salgado Filho Hospital.

References

1959 births
2007 deaths
Argentine male table tennis players
Argentine male discus throwers
Paralympic athletes of Argentina
Paralympic swimmers of Argentina
Paralympic table tennis players of Argentina
Athletes (track and field) at the 1988 Summer Paralympics
Swimmers at the 1988 Summer Paralympics
Table tennis players at the 2004 Summer Paralympics
Medalists at the 1988 Summer Paralympics
Medalists at the 2007 Parapan American Games
Argentine male breaststroke swimmers
Argentine male medley swimmers
Sportspeople from Mendoza Province
20th-century Argentine people